Balša (transl. Balsha) is a Serbian name and may refer to:

Balša Božović, Serbian politician
Balša Brković, Montenegrin writer
Balša Radunović, Montenegrin basketballer
Balša Rajčević, Serbian artist
House of Balšić, Serbian dynasty ruling Zeta
Balša I
Balša II
Balša III
Balša Hercegović, medieval nobleman